Frédéric Bulot Wagha (born 27 September 1990), better known as Frédéric Bulot, is a Gabonese professional footballer who plays as a midfielder for Doxa Katokopias. He was a French youth international, having earned caps with all levels, beginning with the under-16 team.

Career

Monaco
At Monaco, Bulot signed his first professional contract on 18 July 2008 agreeing to a three-year deal until June 2011.

After playing with the club's Championnat de France amateur team for the first two years of the contract, he was promoted to the senior team for the 2010–11 season and was assigned the number 22 shirt by manager Guy Lacombe. On 7 August 2010, Bulot made his professional debut in the club's opening league match against Lyon. He started the match and played 57 minutes before being substituted out in a 0–0 draw.

Caen
In July 2011, he joined Caen on a three-year deal.

Standard Liège
On 30 August 2014, it was announced he had signed a one-year loan deal with Charlton Athletic.

Reims
On 13 July 2015, Bulot signed for Reims.

International career
Bulot was eligible for both France and Gabon on senior international level due to being born to a French father and Gabonese mother. He received his first called up to the Gabon national team in February 2014. He made his international debut in a friendly match against Morocco on 5 March 2014.

Style of play
Former club Monaco described him as a versatile left-footed box-to-box midfielder who is capable of playing as a centre midfielder or an attacker.

References

External links
 
 
 
 
 

1990 births
Living people
Sportspeople from Libreville
Gabonese people of French descent
Association football midfielders
Gabonese footballers
AS Monaco FC players
Stade Malherbe Caen players
Gabon international footballers
France under-21 international footballers
France youth international footballers
Gabonese expatriate footballers
Standard Liège players
Charlton Athletic F.C. players
Stade de Reims players
Tours FC players
FC Hermannstadt players
FC Gifu players
Ligue 1 players
Ligue 2 players
Belgian Pro League players
English Football League players
J2 League players
Gabonese expatriate sportspeople in Belgium
Expatriate footballers in Belgium
Expatriate footballers in England
Expatriate footballers in Romania
2015 Africa Cup of Nations players
Gabonese expatriate sportspeople in England
Gabonese expatriate sportspeople in Monaco
Gabonese expatriate sportspeople in Romania
21st-century Gabonese people